Division No. 1 is a census division in Alberta, Canada. It is located in the southeast corner of southern Alberta and surrounds the City of Medicine Hat.

Census subdivisions 
The following census subdivisions (municipalities or municipal equivalents) are located within Alberta's Division No. 1.

Cities
Medicine Hat
Towns
Bow Island
Redcliff
Villages
Foremost
Municipal districts
Cypress County
Forty Mile No. 8, County of

Demographics 

See also 
List of census divisions of Alberta
List of communities in Alberta

References 

D01